A  reciprocating compressor or piston compressor is a positive-displacement compressor that uses pistons driven by a crankshaft to deliver gases at high pressure. Pressures of up to 5,000 PSIG are commonly produced by multistage reciprocating compressors.

The intake gas enters the suction manifold, then flows into the compression cylinder where it gets compressed by a piston driven in a reciprocating motion via a crankshaft, and is then discharged. Applications include oil refineries, gas pipelines, oil and gas production drilling and well services, air and nitrogen injection, offshore platforms, chemical plants, natural gas processing plants, air conditioning, and refrigeration plants. One specialty application is the blowing of plastic bottles made of polyethylene terephthalate (PET).

In the ionic liquid piston compressor many seals and bearings were removed in the design as the ionic liquid does not mix with the gas. Service life is about 10 times longer than a regular diaphragm compressor with reduced maintenance during use, energy costs are reduced by as much as 20%. The heat exchangers that are used in a normal piston compressor are removed as the heat is removed in the cylinder itself where it is generated. Almost 100% of the energy going into the process is being used with little energy wasted as reject heat.

See also
 Centrifugal compressor
 Diving air compressor
 Vapor-compression refrigeration

References

External links
 Calculation of required cylinder compression for a multistage reciprocating compressor

Gas compressors